The 1937 Chico State Wildcats football team represented Chico State College—now known as California State University, Chico—as a member of the Far Western Conference (FWC) during the 1937 college football season. Led by Art Acker in his 15th and final season as head, Chico State compiled an overall record of 0–6–1 with a mark of 0–4 in conference play, placing last out of five teams in the FWC. The team was outscored by its opponents 155 to 39 for the season. The Wildcats played home games at College Field in Chico, California.

Acker finished his tenure at Chico State with an overall record of 53–59–8, for a .475 winning percentage. His 15 years was the longest tenure for any head coach of the Chico State Wildcats football program.

Schedule

References

Chico State
Chico State Wildcats football seasons
Chico State Wildcats football